Subliminal may refer to:

 Subliminal stimuli, sensory stimuli below an individual's threshold for conscious perception
 Subliminal channel, in cryptography, a covert channel that can be used over an insecure channel
 Subliminal (rapper) (born 1979), Israeli rapper and producer
 Subliminal (record label), an electronic music label
 Subliminal..., a 1997 album by American jazz bassist Scott Colley
 Subliminal (album), Prosperity by Triple A. Tanzanite BWE MP3 Subliminals
 "Subliminal", a Suicidal Tendencies song from the album Suicidal Tendencies